Ilario is a given name. Notable people with the name include:

Ilario Aloe (born 1986), Italian footballer who last played for A.P.D. Ribelle 1927
Ilario Antoniazzi (born 1948), archbishop of the Archdiocese of Tunis since February 21, 2013
Ilario Bandini (1911–1992), Italian businessman, racing driver, and racing car manufacturer
Ilario Castagner (born 1940), Italian football manager and former player
Ilario Di Buò (born 1965), Italian archer, formerly ranked number one in the world
Ilario Cao (Hilarius Caius), Sardinian ecclesiastic active in Rome during the first thirty years of the eleventh century
Ilario Carposio (1852–1921), artistic photographer who owned an important studio in Fiume, now Rijeka in present-day Croatia
Ilario Casolano (1588–1661), Italian painter of the Baroque period
Ilario Cozzi (born 1959), retired Italian professional football player
Ugolino di Prete Ilario, Italian painter
Ilario Lamberti (born 1988), Italian footballer
Ilario Lanivi, Italian politician involved in the formation of a number of political parties
Ilario Lanna (born 1990), Italian footballer
Ilario Pantano (born 1971), former United States Marine Corps second lieutenant
Ilario Passerini (born 1952), Italian sprint canoeist who competed in the mid-1970s
Ilario Pegorari (1949–1982), Italian alpine skier
Ilario Spolverini (1657–1734), Italian painter
Ilario Tranquillo, Italian author of a book on the ancient Napizia, later Pizzo
Ilario Zannino (1920–1996), member of the Patriarca crime family

See also
 Ilario, A Story of the First History, two novels by Mary Gentle, set in an alternate history
 Hilario
 Ilarion
 Ilaro
 Illarion

Italian masculine given names